Electric is the twelfth studio album by English synth-pop duo Pet Shop Boys. It was released on 14 July 2013 on the duo's own label, x2, through Kobalt Label Services. It is the duo's first album since their departure from Parlophone.

In their native United Kingdom, Electric was BBC Radio 2's Album of the Week from 8 July 2013. It features a collaboration with English singer and rapper Example.

Electric reached number three on the UK Albums Chart and number 26 on the US Billboard 200, the duo's highest chart performances in both territories in 20 years. The album also performed well in other markets. It was supported by the Electric Tour which visited 46 countries through 112 concerts.

Background and release
Pet Shop Boys recorded the album in London, Berlin and Los Angeles from November 2012 to April 2013. On 30 April 2013, the duo announced on their website that they had recorded the album over the "last six months", with "Fluorescent" in particular written and recorded within the previous month. Stuart Price, who was enlisted to produce the album, finished mixing the album in late April 2013.

When Pet Shop Boys began working with Price, they made it clear that they wanted to make a "dance record". Price stated that his goal was for every track to have a "euphoric, fresh feel to it". The more dance-influenced nature of Electric was a response to the "reflective mood" of their previous album, Elysium.

The album is the first Pet Shop Boys studio album that was not released through Parlophone. The 28-year relationship between the duo and the label ended when Pet Shop Boys announced that Electric would be released through Kobalt Label Services. Pet Shop Boys subsequently announced that the album would appear on their own label, x2 (pronounced "times two"), under the Kobalt banner. Chris Lowe was given credit for naming the label. Pet Shop Boys intend to release all of their future albums on x2.

The album was simultaneously released worldwide on 15 July 2013 in four formats: CD, digital download, Playbutton and LP.

Promotion
On 14 March 2013, Pet Shop Boys debuted a short trailer for Electric on YouTube.

In support of the album, the duo embarked on the Electric Tour, which began on 22 March 2013 at the Cumbre Tajín festival in Veracruz, Mexico, where they debuted two songs from the album: "Axis" and a cover of Bruce Springsteen's 2007 song "The Last to Die". The tour's first official date took place at the Movistar Arena in Santiago, Chile, on 13 May 2013.

On 30 April 2013, immediately following the official album announcement on Pet Shop Boys' website, the lead single "Axis" premiered online, and was released digitally the following day. The Boys Noize remix of the song was released on 14 May.

The second official single "Vocal" premiered on 1 June 2013 on DJ Dave Pearce's BBC Radio 2 show Dance Years, followed by a digital release on 3 June. A CD single, digital download and 12-inch vinyl single were all released on 29 July 2013, featuring new remixes of the song. A music video for the single was released on 18 June.

The entire album was available for streaming in the United Kingdom via The Guardian.

"Love Is a Bourgeois Construct" was released as the third single on 2 September 2013. The single contains remixes and two B-sides, "Entschuldigung!" and "Get It Online".  "Thursday" was the fourth single from Electric, digitally released on 4 November 2013. The single contains remixes and two B-sides, "No More Ballads", "Odd Man Out". The video footage for the video was shot in Shanghai.

On 27 March 2014, Pet Shop Boys announced they would be releasing "Fluorescent" as a limited edition 12-inch vinyl to celebrate Record Store Day 2014 on 19 April.

Reception

Critical reception

Electric received widespread acclaim from music critics. At Metacritic, which assigns a normalised rating out of 100 to reviews from mainstream publications, the album received an average score of 84, based on 28 reviews, which indicates "universal acclaim". Dorian Lynskey of Q praised several songs on the album and noted, "With Electric, Pet Shop Boys have succeeded spectacularly." Simon Price, music critic for the Independent on Sunday, described the album as "sublime".
The Telegraph commented "Electric is the second really fantastic pop-dance blast of the year".

Commercial performance
The album debuted at number three in the United Kingdom on the UK Albums Chart, selling 15,715 copies in its first week, becoming their highest-charting studio album since Very topped the chart in 1993.

In the United States, Electric debuted at number 26 on the Billboard 200 with first-week sales of 11,000 copies, becoming their highest-charting album since Very charted at number 20 in 1993. It also debuted at number two on Billboards Dance/Electronic Albums chart.

Track listing

Notes
 "Inside a Dream" includes a quotation from "The Land of Dreams" by William Blake (1757–1827)

Personnel
Credits adapted from the liner notes of Electric.

Pet Shop Boys
 Neil Tennant
 Chris Lowe

Additional musicians

 Elliot Gleave – vocals 
 Stuart Price – additional programming ; additional vocals 
 Andy Crookston – additional vocals 
 Pete Gleadall – additional vocals ; additional programming 
 Luke Halls – additional vocals 
 Jessica Freedman – additional vocals 
 Katharine Anne Hoye – additional vocals 
 Adam Blake – handclaps

Technical
 Stuart Price – production, engineering, mixing
 Pete Gleadall – additional engineering ; additional vocals recording 
 Brian Gardner – mastering

Artwork
 Farrow – design, art direction
 PSB – design, art direction
 John Ross – photography

Charts

References

2013 albums
Albums produced by Stuart Price
Pet Shop Boys albums